Tauranga Girls' College is a state single-sex girls secondary school in Tauranga, New Zealand. It offers the NCEA system of qualifications. The school has a roll of  students from years 9 to 13 (approx. ages 12 to 18) as of  The current principal is Ms Tara Kanji.

Tauranga Girls' has many extracurricular activities, the largest of which is the drama production, which is produced with Tauranga Boys' College.

It was created due to the population increase and small area of Tauranga College, which became the site for Tauranga Boys College.

Houses
Tauranga Girls' College has 5 houses.
Batten (blue), named after pilot Jean Batten
Sheppard (purple), named after activist Kate Sheppard
Mansfield (yellow), named after author Katherine Mansfield
Te Auetu (red), named after activist Te Auetu Harata Hall
Whina (green), named after activist Whina Cooper

Notable alumnae

References

External links
 Official Alumni website

Educational institutions established in 1958
Girls' schools in New Zealand
Secondary schools in the Bay of Plenty Region
Schools in Tauranga
1958 establishments in New Zealand